This page lists all described genera and species of the spider family Phrurolithidae. , the World Spider Catalog accepts 219 species in 13 genera:

A

Abdosetae

Abdosetae Fu, Zhang & MacDermott, 2010
 Abdosetae digitata Jin, Fu & Zhang, 2015 — China
 Abdosetae falcata Jin, Fu & Zhang, 2015 — China
 Abdosetae hainan Fu, Zhang & MacDermott, 2010 (type) — China
 Abdosetae hamata Jin, Fu & Zhang, 2015 — China
 Abdosetae ornata (Deeleman-Reinhold, 2001) — Borneo

D

Dorymetaecus

Dorymetaecus Rainbow, 1920
 Dorymetaecus spinnipes Rainbow, 1920 (type) — Australia (Lord Howe Is.)

Drassinella

Drassinella Banks, 1904
 Drassinella gertschi Platnick & Ubick, 1989 — USA, Mexico
 Drassinella modesta Banks, 1904 (type) — USA
 Drassinella schulzefenai (Chamberlin & Ivie, 1936) — Mexico
 Drassinella sclerata (Chamberlin & Ivie, 1935) — USA
 Drassinella siskiyou Platnick & Ubick, 1989 — USA
 Drassinella sonoma Platnick & Ubick, 1989 — USA
 Drassinella unicolor (Chamberlin & Ivie, 1935) — USA

L

Liophrurillus

Liophrurillus Wunderlich, 1992
 Liophrurillus flavitarsis (Lucas, 1846) (type) — Europe, Madeira, North Africa

O

Otacilia

Otacilia Thorell, 1897
 Otacilia acuta Fu, Zhang & Zhang, 2016 — China
 Otacilia ailan Liu, Xu, Xiao, Yin & Peng, 2019 — China
 Otacilia ambon Deeleman-Reinhold, 2001 — Indonesia (Moluccas)
 Otacilia armatissima Thorell, 1897 (type) — Myanmar
 Otacilia aurita Fu, Zhang & Zhang, 2016 — China
 Otacilia bawangling Fu, Zhang & Zhu, 2010 — China
 Otacilia biarclata Fu, He & Zhang, 2015 — China
 Otacilia bicolor Jäger & Wunderlich, 2012 — Laos
 Otacilia bifurcata Dankittipakul & Singtripop, 2014 — Thailand
 Otacilia christae Jäger & Wunderlich, 2012 — Laos
 Otacilia curvata Jin, Fu, Yin & Zhang, 2016 — China
 Otacilia daweishan Liu, Xu, Xiao, Yin & Peng, 2019 — China
 Otacilia digitata Fu, Zhang & Zhang, 2016 — China
 Otacilia fabiformis Liu, Xu, Xiao, Yin & Peng, 2019 — China
 Otacilia flexa Fu, Zhang & Zhang, 2016 — China
 Otacilia florifera Fu, He & Zhang, 2015 — China
 Otacilia forcipata Yang, Wang & Yang, 2013 — China
 Otacilia foveata (Song, 1990) — China
 Otacilia fujiana Fu, Jin & Zhang, 2014 — China
 Otacilia hengshan (Song, 1990) — China
 Otacilia hippocampa Jin, Fu, Yin & Zhang, 2016 — China
 Otacilia jiandao Liu, Xu, Xiao, Yin & Peng, 2019 — China
 Otacilia jianfengling Fu, Zhang & Zhu, 2010 — China
 Otacilia kamurai Ono & Ogata, 2018 — Japan
 Otacilia kao Jäger & Wunderlich, 2012 — Thailand, Vietnam
 Otacilia komurai (Yaginuma, 1952) — China, Korea, Japan
 Otacilia leibo Fu, Zhang & Zhang, 2016 — China
 Otacilia limushan Fu, Zhang & Zhu, 2010 — China
 Otacilia liupan Hu & Zhang, 2011 — China
 Otacilia longituba Wang, Zhang & Zhang, 2012 — China
 Otacilia loriot Jäger & Wunderlich, 2012 — Laos
 Otacilia luna (Kamura, 1994) — Japan
 Otacilia luzonica (Simon, 1898) — Philippines
 Otacilia lynx (Kamura, 1994) — Taiwan, Japan
 Otacilia microstoma Wang, Chen, Zhou, Zhang & Zhang, 2015 — China
 Otacilia mingsheng Yang, Wang & Yang, 2013 — China
 Otacilia mira Fu, Zhang & Zhang, 2016 — China
 Otacilia mustela Kamura, 2008 — Japan
 Otacilia namkhan Jäger & Wunderlich, 2012 — Laos
 Otacilia nonggang Liu, Xu, Xiao, Yin & Peng, 2019 — China
 Otacilia onoi Deeleman-Reinhold, 2001 — Thailand
 Otacilia ovata Fu, Zhang & Zhang, 2016 — China
 Otacilia papilion Fu, Zhang & Zhang, 2016 — China
 Otacilia papilla Dankittipakul & Singtripop, 2014 — Indonesia (Sumatra)
 Otacilia paracymbium Jäger & Wunderlich, 2012 — China
 Otacilia parva Deeleman-Reinhold, 2001 — Indonesia (Sumatra)
 Otacilia pseudostella Fu, Jin & Zhang, 2014 — China
 Otacilia pyriformis Fu, Zhang & Zhang, 2016 — China
 Otacilia revoluta (Yin, Ubick, Bao & Xu, 2004) — China
 Otacilia simianshan Zhou, Wang & Zhang, 2013 — China
 Otacilia sinifera Deeleman-Reinhold, 2001 — Thailand
 Otacilia songi Wang, Chen, Zhou, Zhang & Zhang, 2015 — China
 Otacilia stella Kamura, 2005 — Japan
 Otacilia subliupan Wang, Chen, Zhou, Zhang & Zhang, 2015 — China
 Otacilia submicrostoma Jin, Fu, Yin & Zhang, 2016 — China
 Otacilia taiwanica (Hayashi & Yoshida, 1993) — China, Taiwan, Japan
 Otacilia truncata Dankittipakul & Singtripop, 2014 — Thailand
 Otacilia vangvieng Jäger & Wunderlich, 2012 — Laos
 Otacilia vulpes (Kamura, 2001) — Japan
 Otacilia yangi Zhang, Fu & Zhu, 2009 — China
 Otacilia yangmingensis Jin, Fu, Yin & Zhang, 2016 — China
 Otacilia yinae Liu, Xu, Xiao, Yin & Peng, 2019 — China
 Otacilia zebra Deeleman-Reinhold, 2001 — Thailand
 Otacilia zhangi Fu, Jin & Zhang, 2014 — China

P

Phonotimpus

Phonotimpus Gertsch & Davis, 1940
 Phonotimpus eutypus Gertsch & Davis, 1940 — Mexico
 Phonotimpus marialuisae Chamé-Vázquez & Ibarra-Núñez, 2019 — Mexico
 Phonotimpus pennimani Chamé-Vázquez, Ibarra-Núñez & Jiménez, 2018 — Mexico
 Phonotimpus separatus Gertsch & Davis, 1940 (type) — Mexico
 Phonotimpus talquian Chamé-Vázquez, Ibarra-Núñez & Jiménez, 2018 — Mexico

Phrurolinillus

Phrurolinillus Wunderlich, 1995
 Phrurolinillus lisboensis Wunderlich, 1995 — Portugal
 Phrurolinillus tibialis (Simon, 1878) (type) — Spain

Phrurolithus

Phrurolithus C. L. Koch, 1839
 Phrurolithus absurdus Gertsch, 1941 — USA
 Phrurolithus adjacens Gertsch & Davis, 1940 — Mexico
 Phrurolithus aemulatus Gertsch, 1941 — USA
 Phrurolithus alatus Ivie & Barrows, 1935 — USA
 Phrurolithus annulus Zhou, Wang & Zhang, 2013 — China
 Phrurolithus anticus Wang, Chen, Zhou, Zhang & Zhang, 2015 — China
 Phrurolithus apacheus Gertsch, 1941 — USA
 Phrurolithus apertus Gertsch, 1935 — USA
 Phrurolithus approximatus Gertsch & Davis, 1940 — Mexico
 Phrurolithus banksi Gertsch, 1941 — USA
 Phrurolithus bifidus Yin, Ubick, Bao & Xu, 2004 — China
 Phrurolithus callidus Gertsch, 1935 — USA
 Phrurolithus camawhitae Gertsch, 1935 — USA
 Phrurolithus cangshan Yang, Fu, Zhang & Zhang, 2010 — China
 Phrurolithus catalinius Gertsch, 1941 — USA
 Phrurolithus celatus Fu, Chen & Zhang, 2016 — China
 Phrurolithus claripes (Dönitz & Strand, 1906) — China, Russia (Sakhalin), Taiwan, Japan
 Phrurolithus coahuilanus Gertsch & Davis, 1940 — Mexico
 Phrurolithus concisus Gertsch, 1941 — USA
 Phrurolithus connectus Gertsch, 1941 — USA
 Phrurolithus coreanus Paik, 1991 — Korea, Russia (Kurile Is.), Japan
 Phrurolithus corsicus (Simon, 1878) — Spain, France (Corsica), Italy (Sardinia) to Romania
 Phrurolithus daoxianensis Yin, Peng, Gong & Kim, 1997 — China
 Phrurolithus debilis Gertsch & Davis, 1940 — Mexico
 Phrurolithus dianchiensis Yin, Peng, Gong & Kim, 1997 — China
 Phrurolithus diversus Gertsch & Davis, 1940 — Mexico
 Phrurolithus dolius Chamberlin & Ivie, 1935 — USA
 Phrurolithus duncani (Chamberlin, 1925) — USA
 Phrurolithus emertoni Gertsch, 1935 — USA
 Phrurolithus fanjingshan Wang, Chen, Zhou, Zhang & Zhang, 2015 — China
 Phrurolithus faustus Paik, 1991 — Korea
 Phrurolithus festivus (C. L. Koch, 1835) (type) — Europe, Turkey, Caucasus, Russia (Europe to Far East), Kazakhstan, China, Korea, Japan
 Phrurolithus flavipes O. Pickard-Cambridge, 1872 — Lebanon, Israel
 Phrurolithus florentinus Caporiacco, 1923 — Italy
 Phrurolithus goodnighti Muma, 1945 — USA
 Phrurolithus hamatus Wang, Zhang & Zhang, 2012 — China
 Phrurolithus hamdeokensis Seo, 1988 — Russia (south Siberia, Far East), Korea
 Phrurolithus kastoni Schenkel, 1950 — USA
 Phrurolithus kentuckyensis Chamberlin & Gertsch, 1930 — USA
 Phrurolithus labialis Paik, 1991 — Korea, Japan
 Phrurolithus lasiolepis Fu, Chen & Zhang, 2016 — China
 Phrurolithus leviculus Gertsch, 1936 — USA
 Phrurolithus longus Fu, Chen & Zhang, 2016 — China
 Phrurolithus luppovae Spassky, 1941 — Tajikistan
 Phrurolithus minimus C. L. Koch, 1839 — Europe
 Phrurolithus nemoralis Bryant, 1940 — Cuba
 Phrurolithus nigerus Yin, 2012 — China
 Phrurolithus nigrinus (Simon, 1878) — Central and southern Europe
 Phrurolithus nipponicus Kishida, 1914 — Japan
 Phrurolithus oabus Chamberlin & Ivie, 1935 — USA
 Phrurolithus palgongensis Seo, 1988 — Russia (Far East), China, Korea
 Phrurolithus paludivagus Bishop & Crosby, 1926 — USA
 Phrurolithus parcus (Hentz, 1847) — USA
 Phrurolithus pennatus Yaginuma, 1967 — Russia (south Siberia, Far East), China, Korea, Japan
 Phrurolithus pinturus Ivie & Barrows, 1935 — USA
 Phrurolithus pipensis Muma, 1945 — USA
 Phrurolithus pullatus Kulczyński, 1897 — Central Europe to Central Asia
 Phrurolithus pygmaeus Thorell, 1875 — Ukraine, Russia (Europe)
 Phrurolithus qiqiensis Yin, Ubick, Bao & Xu, 2004 — China
 Phrurolithus schwarzi Gertsch, 1941 — USA
 Phrurolithus shimenensis Yin, Peng, Gong & Kim, 1997 — China
 Phrurolithus similis Banks, 1895 — USA
 Phrurolithus singulus Gertsch, 1941 — USA
 Phrurolithus sinicus Zhu & Mei, 1982 — Russia (south Siberia, Far East), China, Korea, Japan
 Phrurolithus sordidus Savelyeva, 1972 — Kazakhstan
 Phrurolithus spinosus Bryant, 1948 — Hispaniola
 Phrurolithus splendidus Song & Zheng, 1992 — China, Japan
 Phrurolithus subannulus Fu, Chen & Zhang, 2016 — China
 Phrurolithus subnigerus Fu, Chen & Zhang, 2016 — China
 Phrurolithus szilyi Herman, 1879 — Portugal, Spain, Central to southeastern Europe
 Phrurolithus tamaulipanus Gertsch & Davis, 1940 — Mexico
 Phrurolithus taoyuan Fu, Chen & Zhang, 2016 — China
 Phrurolithus tepejicanus Gertsch & Davis, 1940 — Mexico
 Phrurolithus thracia Komnenov & Chatzaki, 2016 — Greece
 Phrurolithus umbratilis Bishop & Crosby, 1926 — USA
 Phrurolithus validus Fu, Chen & Zhang, 2016 — China
 Phrurolithus wallacei Gertsch, 1935 — USA
 Phrurolithus wanshou Yin, 2012 — China
 Phrurolithus zhejiangensis Song & Kim, 1991 — China
 Phrurolithus zhouyun Wang, Chen, Zhou, Zhang & Zhang, 2015 — China
 Phrurolithus zongxu Wang, Zhang & Zhang, 2012 — China

Phruronellus

Phruronellus Chamberlin, 1921
 Phruronellus californicus Chamberlin & Gertsch, 1930 — USA
 Phruronellus floridae Chamberlin & Gertsch, 1930 — USA
 Phruronellus formica (Banks, 1895) (type) — USA
 Phruronellus formidabilis Chamberlin & Gertsch, 1930 — USA
 Phruronellus pictus Chamberlin & Gertsch, 1930 — USA

Phrurotimpus

Phrurotimpus Chamberlin & Ivie, 1935
 Phrurotimpus abditus Gertsch, 1941 — USA
 Phrurotimpus alarius (Hentz, 1847) (type) — USA, Canada
 Phrurotimpus alarius tejanus (Chamberlin & Gertsch, 1930) — USA, Canada
 Phrurotimpus borealis (Emerton, 1911) — North America
 Phrurotimpus certus Gertsch, 1941 — USA, Canada
 Phrurotimpus chamberlini Schenkel, 1950 — USA
 Phrurotimpus dulcineus Gertsch, 1941 — USA, Canada
 Phrurotimpus illudens Gertsch, 1941 — USA
 Phrurotimpus mateonus (Chamberlin & Gertsch, 1930) — USA
 Phrurotimpus minutus (Banks, 1892) — USA
 Phrurotimpus mormon (Chamberlin & Gertsch, 1930) — USA
 Phrurotimpus mormon xanthus Chamberlin & Ivie, 1935 — USA
 Phrurotimpus parallelus (Chamberlin, 1921) — USA
 Phrurotimpus subtropicus Ivie & Barrows, 1935 — USA
 Phrurotimpus truncatus Chamberlin & Ivie, 1935 — USA
 Phrurotimpus woodburyi (Chamberlin & Gertsch, 1929) — USA
 Phrurotimpus woodburyi utanus Chamberlin & Ivie, 1935 — USA

Piabuna

Piabuna Chamberlin & Ivie, 1933
 Piabuna brevispina Chamberlin & Ivie, 1935 — USA
 Piabuna longispina Chamberlin & Ivie, 1935 — USA
 Piabuna nanna Chamberlin & Ivie, 1933 (type) — USA
 Piabuna pallida Chamberlin & Ivie, 1935 — USA
 Piabuna reclusa Gertsch & Davis, 1940 — Mexico
 Piabuna xerophila Chamberlin & Ivie, 1935 — USA

Plynnon

Plynnon Deeleman-Reinhold, 2001
 Plynnon jaegeri Deeleman-Reinhold, 2001 — Indonesia (Sumatra)
 Plynnon longitarse Deeleman-Reinhold, 2001 — Borneo
 Plynnon zborowskii Deeleman-Reinhold, 2001 (type) — Borneo

S

Scotinella

Scotinella Banks, 1911
 Scotinella britcheri (Petrunkevitch, 1910) — USA, Canada
 Scotinella brittoni (Gertsch, 1941) — USA, Canada
 Scotinella custeri Levi, 1951 — USA
 Scotinella deleta (Gertsch, 1941) — USA
 Scotinella divesta (Gertsch, 1941) — USA, Canada
 Scotinella divinula (Gertsch, 1941) — USA, Canada
 Scotinella dixiana Roddy, 1957 — USA
 Scotinella fratrella (Gertsch, 1935) — USA, Canada
 Scotinella madisonia Levi, 1951 — USA, Canada
 Scotinella manitou Levi, 1951 — USA
 Scotinella minnetonka (Chamberlin & Gertsch, 1930) — USA, Canada
 Scotinella pallida Banks, 1911 (type) — USA
 Scotinella pelvicolens (Chamberlin & Gertsch, 1930) — USA
 Scotinella pugnata (Emerton, 1890) — USA, Canada
 Scotinella redempta (Gertsch, 1941) — USA, Canada
 Scotinella sculleni (Gertsch, 1941) — USA, Canada

References

Phrurolithidae
Phrurolithidae